Jason Heath Vorherr is an Australian guitarist,singer and songwriter. He is currently the bassist for the Daryl Braithwaite touring band.

Career 
Jason Vorherr started playing in cover bands as a bass guitarist and as a solo act in the late 1980s. His career as a backing musician began after Graham Goble asked him to join the original members of Little River Band, Birtles Shorrock Goble on their comeback tour. He played bass guitar and performed backing vocals on their gold-award winning album and DVD Full Circle.

In addition to working with Daryl Braithwaite, he has worked with Glenn Shorrock, Brian Cadd, and The Fabulous Caprettos. He is also a resident producer and musician at Soggy Dog Recording Studio.

In 2022, Vorherr released the album Living in the Suburbs, drawn from his personal experiences growing up in the suburbs of Melbourne.

Personal life 

Vorherr grew up in Scoresby, Victoria and attended Scoresby High School. He lives in Upwey, Victoria with his wife and daughter.

Selected videos

References 

Australian rock bass guitarists
Male bass guitarists
Living people
Musicians from Melbourne
Australian record producers
Australian male guitarists
Australian singer-songwriters
Year of birth missing (living people)
People from Scoresby, Victoria